Red River Township may refer to the following townships in the United States:

 Red River Township, Searcy County, Arkansas
 North Red River Township, Kittson County, Minnesota
 South Red River Township, Kittson County, Minnesota